Museum of Victims of Political Repression in Tashkent — is a museum which tells the history of Uzbekistan during the time of the Soviet Union, in particular that of the people killed by the Soviet government at that time. The Museum is divided into 10 parts.

Details 
The Museum of Victims of Political Repression in Tashkent is dedicated to the memory of the people who fought for the independence of Uzbekistan and who were killed by the government. The Museum is one of the youngest museums in Uzbekistan as it was established on 31 August 2002, by the first President of the Republic of Uzbekistan Islam Karimov. The Museum was first located in a very small park area in front of the Tashkent TV tower. The museum has expanded rapidly, and has become part of a large memorial complex. The museum shows the legacy of controversial periods of Uzbekistan's history from the mid-19th century to the second half of the 20th century.

The exhibits at the Museum of Victims of Political Repression in Tashkent are made up of photographs, documents and personal belongings of those killed. The repression started in 1860 when the Russian Empire waged a colonial war in Central Asia. The empire did not only destroy and conqueror the cities, but they also killed a huge number of people. Instead of this, the exhibits describe the time of the Soviet Union, after the October Revolution; about Stalin's regime which was one of the bloodiest periods in the history of modern Uzbekistan; and about the more than 800 criminal cases under the "Cotton case" of the late 1980s. There are maquettes of the concentration camps and prisons where prisoners lived. The biggest stand at the Museum is the "Prison van", on which people were taken to the prison by the commissars.

Objectives 
The Museum of Victims of Political Repression in Tashkent's objectives for improvement are:
 Studying and learning tragic events of the colonial period
 Doing scientific research in public and private archives, in order to find the documents. Photographs and various artefacts related to the museum
 Studying lives and social activities of the victims
 Preparation and publication of literary and scientific contributions of the victims
 Arranging the spiritual and educational activities amongst young generations of Uzbekistan
 Preparation of calendars and posters about the victims

Location 
Museum of Victims of Political Repression in Tashkent is located in Tashkent, in the territory of Shakhidlar Hotirasi, which is translated from Uzbek as the "In Memory of Martyrs"). It is located in front of the Tashkent TV tower. The choice of location of the museum was reinforced by the fact that during construction a number of graves were found of people presumably killed during the Soviet period.

See also 

 State Museum of History of Uzbekistan
 The Museum of Health Care of Uzbekistan
 The Museum of Communication History in Uzbekistan
 Museum of Arts of Uzbekistan
 Tashkent Museum of Railway Techniques
 State Museum of Nature of Uzbekistan
 Tashkent Poly-technical Museum
 The Alisher Navoi State Museum of Literature
 Art Gallery of Uzbekistan
 Museum of Geology, Tashkent
 Tashkent Planetarium

References 

Museums in Tashkent
History museums in Uzbekistan